Niculina Lazarciuc (born 6 December 1957) is a Romanian sprinter. She competed in the women's 400 metres at the 1980 Summer Olympics.

References

External links
 

1957 births
Living people
Athletes (track and field) at the 1980 Summer Olympics
Romanian female sprinters
Olympic athletes of Romania
Place of birth missing (living people)
Olympic female sprinters